The 2013 Masters Tournament was the 77th edition of the Masters Tournament and the first of golf's four major championships to be held in 2013. It was held from April 11–14 at Augusta National Golf Club in Augusta, Georgia. Adam Scott won the tournament on the second hole of a sudden death playoff against Ángel Cabrera. It was Scott's first major championship and the first time an Australian won the Masters.

Course

Field
The Masters has the smallest field of the four major championships. Officially, the Masters remains an invitation event, but there is a set of qualifying criteria that determines who is included in the field. Each player is classified according to the first category by which he qualified, with other categories in which he qualified shown in parentheses.

Golfers who qualify based solely on their performance in amateur tournaments (categories 6–10) must remain amateurs on the starting day of the tournament to be eligible to play.

Four players were appearing in their first major: Steven Fox, Michael Weaver, Guan Tianlang and T. J. Vogel. Thirteen others were appearing in their first Masters: Alan Dunbar, John Peterson, David Lynn, John Huh,  Scott Piercy, Russell Henley, Ted Potter Jr., George Coetzee, Nicolas Colsaerts, Jamie Donaldson, Branden Grace, Thorbjørn Olesen, Thaworn Wiratchant.

1. Past Masters Champions
Ángel Cabrera, Fred Couples (11), Ben Crenshaw, Trevor Immelman, Zach Johnson (15,16,17,18,19), Bernhard Langer, Sandy Lyle, Phil Mickelson (11,15,16,17,18,19), Larry Mize, José María Olazábal, Mark O'Meara, Charl Schwartzel (18,19), Vijay Singh, Craig Stadler, Bubba Watson (11,15,17,18,19), Tom Watson, Mike Weir, Tiger Woods (2,13,15,16,17,18,19), Ian Woosnam

(Past champions who did not play: Tommy Aaron, Jack Burke Jr., Billy Casper, Charles Coody, Nick Faldo, Raymond Floyd, Doug Ford, Bob Goalby, Jack Nicklaus, Arnold Palmer, Gary Player, Fuzzy Zoeller.  Nicklaus, Palmer, and Player served as "honorary starters" and teed off on the first day at the first hole to kick off the tournament.)

2. Last five U.S. Open Champions
Lucas Glover, Graeme McDowell (11,12,18,19), Rory McIlroy (4,14,15,16,17,18,19), Webb Simpson (12,15,17,18,19)

3. Last five British Open Champions
Stewart Cink, Ernie Els (13,15,17,18,19), Pádraig Harrington (4,11,12), Louis Oosthuizen (11,15,17,18,19)

Darren Clarke – did not play due to a hamstring injury.

4. Last five PGA Champions
Keegan Bradley (14,15,16,17,18,19), Martin Kaymer (18,19), Yang Yong-eun

5. Last three winners of The Players Championship
K. J. Choi (18), Tim Clark, Matt Kuchar (11,15,16,17,18,19)

6. Top two finishers in the 2012 U.S. Amateur
Steven Fox (a), Michael Weaver (a)

7. Winner of the 2012 Amateur Championship
Alan Dunbar (a)

8. Winner of the 2012 Asia-Pacific Amateur Championship
Guan Tianlang (a)

9. Winner of the 2012 U.S. Amateur Public Links
T. J. Vogel (a)

10. Winner of the 2012 U.S. Mid-Amateur
Nathan Smith (a)

11. The top 16 finishers and ties in the 2012 Masters Tournament
Jim Furyk (12,15,17,18,19), Sergio García (15,16,17,18,19), Peter Hanson (18,19), Hunter Mahan (15,17,18,19), Kevin Na, Ian Poulter (14,18,19), Justin Rose (14,15,17,18,19), Adam Scott (13,15,17,18,19), Lee Westwood (15,17,18,19)

12. Top 8 finishers and ties in the 2012 U.S. Open
Jason Dufner (15,16,17,18,19), John Peterson, Michael Thompson (16,19), David Toms (18)

13. Top 4 finishers and ties in the 2012 British Open Championship
Brandt Snedeker (15,16,17,18,19)

14. Top 4 finishers and ties in the 2012 PGA Championship
David Lynn (18), Carl Pettersson (15,16,17,18,19)

15. Top 30 leaders on the 2012 PGA Tour official money earnings list
Ben Curtis (16), Luke Donald (17,18,19), Rickie Fowler (16,17,18,19), Robert Garrigus (17,18,19), John Huh (17), Dustin Johnson (16,17,18,19), Ryan Moore (17,18,19), Scott Piercy (16,17,18,19), Steve Stricker (17,18,19), Bo Van Pelt (17,18,19), Nick Watney (16,17,18,19)

16. Winners of PGA Tour events that award a full-point allocation for the season-ending Tour Championship, between the 2012 Masters Tournament and the 2013 Masters Tournament
Brian Gay, Russell Henley (19), Martin Laird, Marc Leishman, John Merrick, D. A. Points, Ted Potter Jr., Kevin Streelman

17. All players qualifying for the 2012 edition of The Tour Championship
John Senden (18,19)

18. Top 50 on the final 2012 Official World Golf Ranking list
Thomas Bjørn, George Coetzee (19), Nicolas Colsaerts (19), Jason Day (19), Jamie Donaldson (19), Gonzalo Fernández-Castaño (19), Hiroyuki Fujita, Branden Grace (19), Bill Haas (19), Paul Lawrie (19), Matteo Manassero (19), Francesco Molinari (19), Thorbjørn Olesen (19)

19. Top 50 on the Official World Golf Ranking list on March 31, 2013
Freddie Jacobson, Henrik Stenson, Richard Sterne

20. International invitees
Ryo Ishikawa, Thaworn Wiratchant

Round summaries

First round
Thursday, April 11, 2013

Second round
Friday, April 12, 2013

For 2013 the minimum number of players making the cut was increased from 44 to 50 (plus ties). As previously, all players within 10 shots of the leader also make the cut. 61 players made the cut, all those within 10 shots of the leader. Fourteen-year-old Guan Tianlang, playing in his first Masters, was the only amateur player to make the cut, despite being penalized a stroke for slow play.

Amateurs: Guan (+4), Vogel (+8), Weaver (+8), Smith (+11), Fox (+13), Dunbar (+16).
Note: Tiger Woods originally signed for a 71 which gave him 70-71=141 (−3). However, his second-round score was adjusted on Saturday morning to a 73 (see below).

Third round
Saturday, April 13, 2013

Prior to the third round, a controversy concerning Tiger Woods developed. After Friday's second round, Woods signed for a score of 71 (−1), which included a bogey at the par-5 15th hole. Woods' third shot had hit the pin and rebounded into the water hazard. He took a penalty stroke and appeared to take his drop at the same position from which he had played his third shot. In an interview following the round Woods stated that he had actually dropped the ball two yards further back from the pin than the original position. Based upon hearing the interview, tournament officials met with Woods Saturday morning and deemed the drop to have been in contravention of the rules. This could have meant disqualification, but instead Woods was assessed a two-stroke penalty for the illegal drop. He therefore scored a triple-bogey 8 at the 15th and had an adjusted second round score of 73 (+1).

Final round
Sunday, April 14, 2013

Summary
In the final round, played in a cold and steady rain, third round co-leader Brandt Snedeker fell out of contention with a 75. Jason Day had the lead with three holes to go but bogeyed the 16th and 17th holes to finish in third place at 281 (−7). Adam Scott and Ángel Cabrera both birdied the 72nd hole to finish tied for the lead at 279 (−9). Playing in the group ahead of the final twosome, Scott rolled in a 25-footer (8 m). Minutes later Cabrera matched Scott's birdie when he hit his approach shot to 3 feet (1 m) and made the putt to force a playoff.

The sudden-death playoff began at the 18th hole, where Scott and Cabrera both scrambled for par from just short of the green after their approach shots each landed on the front section of the green and backed just off the fringe, with Cabrera's chip nearly holing out. At the next hole, #10, both were in the fairway then on the green in regulation. Cabrera's lengthy putt just missed and he tapped in for par. With the opportunity to win and in fading light, Scott sank his  birdie putt for the victory. It was Scott's first major championship and the only time an Australian has won the Masters, after producing nine runners-up in the tournament. Following his victory, he paid tribute to Greg Norman: "It was one guy who inspired a nation of golfers, and that is Greg Norman". Earlier that day, Norman said that if an Australian won the title "it would mean everything to [him]".

Final leaderboard

Scorecard

Cumulative tournament scores, relative to par
Source:

Playoff

The sudden-death playoff began on the 18th hole and ended on the 10th hole.

Scorecard
Playoff

Cumulative sudden-death playoff scores, relative to par

References

External links

Coverage on the PGA Tour's official site
Coverage on the European Tour's official site
Coverage from the PGA of America
Coverage from CBS Sports
Coverage by The Augusta Chronicle

2013
2013 in golf
2013 in American sports
2013 in sports in Georgia (U.S. state)
April 2013 sports events in the United States